Atom Squad was an American science-fiction TV series that was broadcast live five times a week by the NBC network (out of their Philadelphia studios), Monday July 6, 1953, to January 22, 1954, running Monday through Friday, 5:00 to 5:15 pm EST. Each episode was only 15 minutes long, with a total of 142 black and white episodes.

Synopsis
The Atom Squad is a secret government agency that dealt with Cold War threats to US security involving radiation and nuclear weapons. The Atom Squad scientists, Steve Elliot and Dave Fielding, were respectively played by Robert Courtleigh and Bob Hastings, their chief by Bram Nossem.

The Atom Squad's secret New York City headquarters laboratory looked very much like Captain Video's secret mountain headquarters control room. The program's opening sequence showed a man in a "radiation suit" lumbering very slowly toward the camera.

Production notes
Storylines were usually completed in five, or sometimes 10 broadcasts. Paul Monash was the chief writer for the series and possibly its creator. The foes of the Atom Squad were usually mad scientists and evil Communist spies and saboteurs. However, the Squad ran into aliens from outer space in at least three different storylines.

Atom Squad originated from the studios of WPTZ in Philadelphia. The director was Joe Behar, and producers were Larry White and later Adrian Samish.

The theme music for the series was "Tumult and Commotion", an excerpt from Miklos Rozsa's orchestral work "Theme, Variations and Finale, Op. 13". The opening theme music (man in "radiation suit") was taken from original music by Serge Prokofiev for the Sergei Eisenstein film Alexander Nevsky.

Episode status
While Atom Squad kinescopes were probably made for West Coast rebroadcast, none are known to survive today. The series did not appear to have a sponsor and no tie-in toys or premiums are known to exist.

References

External links
 
Atom Squad Episode Guide
Atom Squad on Space Hero Files

1953 American television series debuts
1954 American television series endings
1950s American science fiction television series
American children's adventure television series
NBC original programming
American live television series
Space adventure television series
Black-and-white American television shows
English-language television shows
Lost television shows
Television series about nuclear war and weapons